

The Wendt WH-1 Traveler is an American two-seat homebuilt sporting aircraft designed by Harold Wendt and built by his company Wendt Aircraft Engineering. Plans for the Traveler were available for amateur construction.

Design
The WH-1 Traveler is a cantilever low-wing monoplane with a conventional wooden fuselage, the wing is a constant-cord two-spar structure with ailerons but no flaps. The prototype aircraft is powered by a  Continental A-75 air-cooled engine driving a metal two-bladed fixed pitch tractor propeller. The Traveler has a fixed tricycle landing gear with a steerable nose-wheel and glassfibre wheel fairings. The pilot and passenger sit in tandem in an enclosed cockpit with a port-hinged canopy with transparent panels at each side, it also had stowage behind the rear-seat for 50 lb (23 kg) of baggage.

Specifications

References

Notes

Bibliography

1970s United States civil utility aircraft
Homebuilt aircraft
Low-wing aircraft
Single-engined tractor aircraft
Traveler
Aircraft first flown in 1972